Golden Moments is a compilation album by American recording artist Jill Scott, released June 16, 2015 on Hidden Beach Recordings. The album comprised Scott's best songs from her four albums with Hidden Beach Recordings. The album omits Scott's singles: "Love Rain", "Lovely Day" and "Whenever You're Around".

Featured are Scott's hit singles "The Way", "Hate on Me", "Gettin' In the Way", and the Top Ten R&B hit, "A Long Walk". Also included is a track titled, "Comes To Light (Everything)" from The Original Jill Scott from the Vault, Vol. 1, and a new unreleased rare track, an acoustic ballad, "I Adore You."

Track listing

References

External links 
 
 hiddenbeach.com - Jill Scott

2015 compilation albums
Jill Scott (singer) compilation albums